Two ships have been named PS Magna Charta both operating as ferries on the River Humber:

PS Magna Charta (1826) was a wooden paddlesteamer built in North Shields.
 was an iron paddlesteamer built for the Manchester, Sheffield and Lincolnshire Railway.

References

Ship names